Signal Regiment is an independent regiment of the Namibian Army based at Windhoek. It functions as the Army's Signals Formation and hosts all the signals squadrons of the Army. It was founded in 1991 as the signal company, later it was upgraded into the Signal regiment in November 1998.

Equipment

The Regiment uses the following Vehicles:
Toyota Hilux
Toyota Land Cruiser
Wer'wolf MKII

The Regiment uses the following  Radio and Telephone equipment:
Cheetah 1 VHF man portable radio
Cheetah 3 VHF man portable radio 
Leopard HF, VHF & UHF radio

Training
Service personnel specializing in Signals are trained at the School of Signals in Okahandja. The three courses in which signallers are taught are the  Signal Officers Course, Computer Course and Communication Courses

Leadership

References

Military of Namibia